The 2022 Next Generation ATP Finals (also known as the Intesa Sanpaolo Next Gen ATP Finals for sponsorship reasons) was a men's exhibition tennis tournament for the eight highest-ranked singles players on the 2022 ATP Tour who are aged 21 and under. It was held from 8 to 12 November 2022 at the Allianz Cloud Arena in Milan, Italy.

Brandon Nakashima defeated Jiří Lehečka in the final, 4–3(7–5), 4–3(8–6), 4–2, to win the title. Nakashima became the first player to win the exhibition on his second appearance.

Carlos Alcaraz was the reigning champion, but withdrew from the event before competition began.

Qualification
The top eight players in the 2022 ATP Race to Milan will qualify. Eligible players must be 21 or under at the end of the calendar year.

Notes

Results

Final
  Brandon Nakashima def.  Jiří Lehečka, 4–3(7–5), 4–3(8–6), 4–2

Seeds

Alternates

Draw

Finals

Green Group

Red Group

Standings are determined by: 1. number of wins; 2. number of matches; 3. in two-players-ties, head-to-head records; 4. in three-players-ties, percentage of sets won, then percentage of games won, then head-to-head records; 5. ATP rankings.

See also
2022 ATP Tour
2022 ATP Finals

References

External links

2022
2022 ATP Tour
2022 tennis exhibitions
2022 Next Generation ATP Finals
2022 in Italian tennis
November 2022 sports events in Italy